Clarence Vick "Footsie" Blair (July 13, 1900 – July 1, 1982) was an American second baseman in Major League Baseball (MLB). He played three seasons in the majors, from 1929 to 1931, for the Chicago Cubs.

In a 246 game major league career, Blair posted a .273 batting average (243-for-890) with 138 runs, 10 home runs and 96 RBIs. Playing at first, second and third base, he recorded a .960 fielding percentage.

External links

1900 births
1982 deaths
Major League Baseball second basemen
Baseball players from Oklahoma
People from Haskell County, Oklahoma
Chicago Cubs players